Ocean Infinity is a marine robotics company based in Austin, Texas, United States and Southampton, United Kingdom and was founded in 2017. The company uses robots to obtain information from the ocean and seabed.

History
Ocean Infinity is based in Houston, Texas and Southampton, England, and was founded in July 2017. The company is led by CEO Oliver Plunkett and is a privately held company. Ocean Infinity was created after recognising the effectiveness of using marine robots in scale to acquire and analyse data from the oceans.

Robots
Ocean Infinity operates two robotic fleets; the Armada fleet and the Infinity fleet. The Infinity fleet is made up of fourteen autonomous underwater vehicles that are currently operating in oceans globally and the Armada fleet will initially comprise fifteen robotic ships that will be operational by the end of 2020. The fleets are equipped with sensors and navigation technology and are capable of operating down to 6,000 meters depth.

Projects
Ocean Infinity was involved in the search for Malaysia Airlines Flight 370 in early 2018, deploying Seabed Constructor between January and May without success. In November of the same year, Seabed Constructor located the wreck of Argentine submarine , which had disappeared a year earlier. At the end of December 2018, Ocean Infinity was contracted by the South Korean government to search for the wreck of the sunken bulk carrier ship , which sank in March 2017 in the South Atlantic Ocean off the coast of Uruguay. On 17 February 2019, the company announced that it believed it had found the ship's wreck, and soon afterwards retrieved the voyage data recorder.

In addition to the high-profile wreck searches, Ocean Infinity has also undertaken data acquisition support for Total E&P, Shell Mauritania, Norwegian Petroleum Directorate, Exxon Mobil, NOAA and Petrobras.

In July 2019, the company found the French Navy submarine , 50 years after its disappearance. In 2020, Ocean Infinity also worked with Search INC to locate the USS Nevada.

References

External links
 

Search for Malaysia Airlines Flight 370
Companies based in Houston
American companies established in 2017
2017 establishments in Texas